Radion Posyevkin (born 18 May 2001) is a professional Ukrainian football midfielder who plays for Vorskla Poltava.

Career
Born in Poltava Oblast, Posyevkin is a product of local Kremin Kremenchuk youth sportive school system.

In August 2018 he was signed by Vorskla Poltava. He made his debut as a second half-time substituted player for Vorskla Poltava in the Ukrainian Premier League in an away drawing match against FC Lviv on 3 July 2020.

References

External links
Statistics at UAF website (Ukr)

2001 births
Living people
People from Kremenchuk
Ukrainian footballers
FC Vorskla Poltava players
FC Hirnyk-Sport Horishni Plavni players
Ukrainian Premier League players
Ukraine youth international footballers
Association football midfielders
Ukrainian First League players
Sportspeople from Poltava Oblast